The Election Commission of India held the indirect 4th presidential elections of India on 6 May 1967. Dr. Zakir Husain, with 471,244 votes, won the presidency over his rival Koka Subba Rao, who garnered 363,971 votes.

Schedule
The election schedule was announced by the Election Commission of India on 3 April 1967.

Results
Source: Web archive of Election Commission of India website

See also
 1967 Indian vice presidential election

References

1967 elections in India
Presidential elections in India